Niu Guannan (born 10 May 1992) is a Chinese water polo player. 

She was part of the Chinese team at the 2015 World Aquatics Championships.

See also
 China women's Olympic water polo team records and statistics

References

External links
 

Chinese female water polo players
Living people
Place of birth missing (living people)
1992 births
Water polo players at the 2016 Summer Olympics
Water polo players at the 2020 Summer Olympics
Olympic water polo players of China
Asian Games medalists in water polo
Water polo players at the 2018 Asian Games
Asian Games gold medalists for China
Medalists at the 2018 Asian Games
21st-century Chinese women